Wilhelm Gallhof (24 July 1878 in Iserlohn - June 1918) was a German painter and sculptor. At the beginning of the 20th century he was one of the most important German  painters of female nudes in the Impressionist and Jugendstil movements.

Life 
Little biographical information is known about Gallhof. According to some sources, he studied art with the history painter Johann Caspar Herterich at the Academy of Fine Arts in Munich, then at the Kunstgewerbeschule in Karlsruhe with Ludwig Schmidt-Reutte and finally with the painter Lovis Corinth, who belonged to the Berlin Secession, in Berlin. He worked in Weimar and Paris, among other places. Wilhelm Gallhof had a "fast" style of painting and was controversial because of his numerous erotic paintings, which were considered pornographic at the time, but was accepted and highly valued in art circles. His motifs fit into the zeitgeist of the upheaval before the First World War and anticipated the lifestyle of the golden twenties. Gallhof died as a soldier at the end of World War I, around the age of 40.

Wilhelm Gallhof was a member of Deutscher Künstlerbund.

Gallhof's most famous and frequently cited and copied work is The Coral Necklace (Die Korallenkette) from 1917. The nude shows a fully undressed woman on a chair, looking into a hand mirror, wearing coral necklaces around her neck and ankle. The painting appeared on the cover of the Munich art and literature magazine Jugend in 1917.

Gallery

References 

20th-century German painters
Modern painters
1878 births
1918 deaths
German military personnel killed in World War I
German Army personnel of World War I